OSFA may refer to:

 Office of Student Financial Aid (or Financial Assistance), at institutions of higher education
 Oklahoma State Firefighters Association
 Old Scholars Football Association
 One size fits all
 One Size Fits All (Frank Zappa album), a 1975 album by Frank Zappa
 Orthopedic Surgery of the Foot and Ankle